The Hart 830 is a four-stroke, naturally aspirated, 3.0-litre, V8 racing engine, designed and made by Hart Racing Engines, and specially developed and tuned by British engineer Brian Hart, for Formula One racing, between  and . The engines were used by Footwork and Minardi. It developed , making it one of the more powerful V8 engines on the field.

Applications
Footwork FA16
Footwork FA17
Minardi M197

References

V8 engines
Formula One engines